The Burglar is a 1957 crime thriller film noir released by Columbia Pictures, based on the 1953 novel of the same name by David Goodis (who also wrote the script). The picture stars Dan Duryea in the titular role and Jayne Mansfield. The movie was the first feature film directed by Paul Wendkos. John Facenda, a well-known Philadelphia sportscaster, is featured as a news anchor in one scene. Much of the film was shot on location in Philadelphia and Atlantic City.

Plot
A wealthy Philadelphia man's personal estate and fortune is left to the leader of a spiritualist group, headed by an older woman known as "Sister Sara". Part of the bequest is an extravagant jewelled necklace.

Intending to steal the jewels, Nat Harbin forms a gang, that includes two men, Baylock and Dohmer, and Gladden, the daughter of his mentor. Gladden is dispatched to case the spiritualist's estate. Posing as a devotee of the group's work, she is invited by Sister Sara to stay for lunch and dinner.

Gladden reports back to Harbin about where to find Sister Sara's safe. The safest time to rob it is when Sister Sara is absorbed in the evening television newscast. Parked near the mansion, Harbin enters through a window, quickly finding the safe while Sister Sara watches the news downstairs.

As Harbin works on the safe with a muted drill, he is signalled that he is needed outside. Two officers in a police car have approached the thieves' car while Harbin's two cohorts hide nearby. Harbin tells the policemen that he has had car trouble and will wait there until morning when he can get help. Apparently convinced by his story, the policemen drive back to their station. Harbin hurries back to the safe, succeeds in opening it and taking the necklace.

Sister Sara is shocked to discover the burglary while getting ready for bed. In the meantime, Harbin and the two others change their car's license plates and make their getaway. They are followed, however, by another car. At their hideout, Blaylock and Dohmer are eager to fence the necklace and get their share of the money, but Harbin says that they have to wait until news of the robbery dies down and to increase the return they might get from a fence. At police headquarters, one of the officers that talked to Harbin makes a police artist create a sketch of the suspected robber.

At the gang's hideaway, tensions build within the group. Gladden is especially out of place and unhappy, with Dohmer clearly lusting after her. Blaylock wants to leave the country quickly and achieve his dream of a quiet life in Central America. Harbin seems anxious and unable to act and tells Blaylock about his and Gladden's past and the responsibility he feels for her. After a violent altercation with Dohmer, Harbin sends her off to Atlantic City to wait for him.

When Gladden takes the train to Atlantic City, she is followed by a man whose face we cannot see. The same man later approaches her on the beach, and the two strike up a relationship but his face is still not revealed to the camera. In Philadelphia, Harbin meets a woman named Della who tells him about her own hard life and invites him to her apartment. Having fallen asleep, Harbin awakens to find her gone from the apartment. Stepping outside, he sees her with another man, apparently the same faceless man who has been getting close to Gladden, and hears the two conspiring about getting the necklace. He then quickly steals away.

Realizing that Gladden is in danger, Harbin drives toward Atlantic City with Blaylock and Dohmer, but a toll booth operator recognizes him from the police sketch and calls the authorities. A bit later, the gang's car is stopped by an officer for a routine traffic violation. Panicking, Dohmer shoots the policeman, who fires back and kills him. Harbin and Blaylock abandon the car with Dohmer's body near Atlantic City, where they take refuge in a deserted shack. Knowing that the man he heard with Della has been pretending to be Gladden's boyfriend, Harbin calls her hotel room and tells her to send the boyfriend away so that he can see her. When the man comes downstairs to the lobby, his face is finally revealed and Harbin realizes that he is Charlie, one of the officers who questioned him on the night of the burglary.

In Gladden's room, Harbin hides the necklace under her pillow after the two quarrel. When Harbin goes back to the shack, Gladden finds the jewels and hides them in her own small musical jewel box. Charlie, meanwhile, has called Della and told her to come to Atlantic City. At the shack, Charlie has killed Blaylock and confronts Harbin, offering to spare him and even give him a cut of the money he'll get if Harbin gives him the necklace. Once Della arrives, Harbin reveals that he hid the jewels in Gladden's room, and Charlie heads out, leaving Della to hold a gun on Harbin. Harbin, though, walks out, hoping that Della will not be able to shoot him, which she does not.

Harbin is able to call Gladden at her room just before Charlie can arrive. The two meet at Atlantic City's Steel Pier, where Gladden shows Harbin the music box she brought from her room. The two retreat to the "Endless Tunnel" attraction to hide from Charlie, who follows them in and finds them when Gladden drops the box and it plays its tune. As the three sit together at a show, Harbin offers the necklace in return for Gladden's life. As Gladden leaves, Charlie shoots Harbin in the back and he falls down the stairs, where Gladden takes him in her arms. The police arrive, having been alerted, and congratulate Charlie, who has displayed his police credentials, on stopping the wanted fugitive. Charlie claims that Harbin had thrown the jewels into the ocean, but Della has just arrived and is enraged that he seems to be cutting her out of their deal. When Charlie lunges at Della, the head detective punches him and finds the jewelry in his pocket. Charlie is handcuffed and led away.

Cast
 Dan Duryea as Nathaniel "Nat" Harbin
 Jayne Mansfield as Gladden
 Martha Vickers as Della 
 Peter Capell as Baylock
 Mickey Shaughnessy as Dohmer
 Stewart Bradley as Charlie
 John Facenda
 Wendell K. Phillips as Police Capt. Keebler 
 Phoebe Mackay as Sister Sara, burglary victim
 Sam Elber as Gerald, burglar

Remake
This film was remade in 1971 as The Burglars, directed by Henri Verneuil and starring Omar Sharif, Jean Paul Belmondo and Dyan Cannon.

References

External links
 
 
 
 

1957 films
1957 crime drama films
American black-and-white films
American crime drama films
Columbia Pictures films
1950s English-language films
Film noir
Films based on American novels
Films directed by Paul Wendkos
Films set in Atlantic City, New Jersey
Films shot in Atlantic City, New Jersey
Films set in New Jersey
American chase films
American neo-noir films
Films scored by Sol Kaplan
1950s American films